Ruth Nelson may refer to:

Ruth Nelson (volleyball)
Ruth Nelson (actress)